SkyRise Miami was a super tall entertainment and observation tower under construction on the shore of Biscayne Bay in Miami, Florida. It was proposed and developed by real estate developer Jeff Berkowitz.
The main developer of the project was the American company Berkowitz Development Group, a Florida-based corporation headquartered in the Coconut Grove neighborhood of Miami. The project was approved by the city commission and Miami voters in 2014. A significant portion of the several hundred million dollar project may be funded by foreign investors seeking American citizenship through EB-5 visas. The project was officially cancelled on June 28, 2021.

Height

Original project
The project was originally proposed as a tower called "Solar Universe" by a company called High Point Energy.  The tower would have been a self-sufficient, vertical, energy structure that would have operated using alternative energies such as solar, wind, hydro, and biomass.  It was going to be a giant tower with 11 wind turbines on its Eastern side, and a collection of  solar panels covering the 1000 foot southern face of the tower.  In April 2012, D’Agostino sold the rights to Solar Universe LLC to Jeffrey Berkowitz, who first changed the name to Skyhigh Miami, and then in August 2013, he changed it to Skyrise Miami.

Controversy
Developer Jeff Berkowitz pledged repeatedly that SkyRise would be built at no cost to the city of Miami, and ran an ad campaign during the campaign for the project's approval vote that flatly stated that "taxpayers win without putting in a cent."  He also made the same claim using almost the same wording, "not one cent of Miami money", in a city commission meeting in June 2014.  But months earlier, in February 2014, he had quietly applied for US$15 million in economic development funding.  Local blogger Al Crespo referred to Berkowitz as a "duplicitous hypocrite" for claiming that the project would be privately funded while quietly seeking public funding.  Berkowitz responded by threatening to sue Crespo for "false and libelous statements", demanding that he remove the article from his blog that alleges that Berkowitz deceived Miami taxpayers.

References

External links
 
 SkyRise Miami at Emporis
 Rendering photos of SkyRise Miami

Proposed skyscrapers in the United States
Observation towers in the United States
Residential skyscrapers in Miami
Arquitectonica buildings